Henning Conle (born February 1944) is a UK-based German-Swiss billionaire property owner.

Through a Liechtenstein-registered company, Sirosa, Conle owns "almost £2bn of prime real estate" in central London, including the Liberty of London building, the Kensington Roof Gardens, the London offices of Manchester United and the art deco Shell Mex House on the Strand.

In Germany, Conle may own "more than 10,000 properties", and in Hamburg, owned up to 2,500 flats in the 1990s. Conle is "long-renowned in his home country of Germany for shoddy buildings and acrimonious tenant disputes".

In 2013, Conle purchased the Kensington Roof Gardens through a company, Cartina Kensington Ltd, registered in the British Virgin Islands and owned by Sirosa Anstalt. The property was purchased for £225 million, £25 million higher than the closest bidder – the Qatar Investment Authority.

There has been speculation that Conle acts on behalf of Russian investors, though representatives for Sirosa Have denied this.

In 2018 media investigations shows, that Conle is involved in AfD donation scandal by illegal financing politicians of Germany's right-wing party "Alternative for Germany", especially Alice Weidel.

Other companies owned by Conle include the British-registered Strandbrook, of which Conle and his daughter Johanna Conle are registered officers.

According to The Sunday Times Rich List in 2020 his net worth was estimated at £1.168 billion.

References

1944 births
Living people
German billionaires